Pitcairn's Island is the third installment in the fictional trilogy by Charles Nordhoff and James Norman Hall about the mutiny aboard HMS Bounty.  It is preceded by Mutiny on the "Bounty" and Men Against the Sea. The novel first appeared in The Saturday Evening Post (from 22 September 1934 through 3 November 1934) then was published in 1934 by Little, Brown and Company. Chapters I–XV are told in the third person, and Chapters XVI–XXI are told in the first person by John Adams.  The epilogue that follows is in the third person.

Synopsis 

After two unsuccessful attempts to settle on the island of Tubuai, the Bounty mutineers returned to Tahiti where they parted company. Fletcher Christian and eight of his men, together with eighteen Polynesians, sailed from Tahiti in September 1789, and for a period of eighteen years nothing was heard of them. Then, in 1808, the American sailing vessel Topaz discovered a thriving community of mixed blood on Pitcairn Island under the rule of "Alexander Smith" (the assumed name of John Adams, the only survivor of the fifteen men who had landed there so long before).

External links 
 
 Preface to The Bounty Trilogy by Charles Nordhoff and James Norman Hall
 Pitcairn's Island, Project Gutenberg

1934 American novels
Little, Brown and Company books
Novels about HMS Bounty
Novels set in Tahiti
Novels about alcoholism
Collaborative novels